Vin Gonzales is a fictional character, a supporting character of Spider-Man in Marvel Comics' main shared universe. He was the roommate of Peter Parker as well as Parker's first romantic rival since the retconing of his marriage to Mary Jane Watson in "One More Day." He is the younger brother of Michelle Gonzales.

Fictional character biography
Vin Gonzales, an NYPD officer, is currently the roommate of Peter Parker. When Peter was in search of roommate, Harry Osborn offered the idea of Vin, a friend of Lily and Carlie. He does not seem to trust Spider-Man. Vin seems to have a crush on Carlie Cooper. When the first rent arrives, Vin and Peter recently had an argument because of Peter's problems at the Daily Bugle. Vin thought that Peter still had his job as a photographer and Vin was giving Peter news tips. Peter decided not to tell Vin until he had found a job. Vin thought that Peter was playing him and that made Vin very angry.

His anger towards Spider-Man increased where Kraven the Hunter's daughter Ana Tatiana Kravinoff had mistaken him from Spider-Man, causing trouble for him by having Vin placed on suspension from his job and after he was captured, Vin had to be saved by the real Spider-man (who was wearing the costume of his fellow crime fighter Daredevil). Spider-Man then had to use a cover story by pretending he left a costume with Peter Parker to protect his identity which was actually intended to prevent Vin from suspecting that Spider-Man was Peter himself.

Later, Carlie Cooper found that a group of Spider-tracers were in the vicinity of Peter's and Vin's apartment. She goes over to investigate, only to discover a bag of spider-tracers under Vin's bed. Vin returns to get his key when Carlie reveals the bag and asks for explanation. Vin is unable to explain himself until his partner, Alan O'Neal, chastises him and slips that "we gave 'em to you to take care of". Vin later admitted to Carlie that he and Al were involved in a secret conspiracy with other policemen to turn public opinion against Spider-Man in a smear campaign by planting tracers on people already dead to hopefully put an end to Spider-Mans' vigilante activities. It was revealed that Vin was recruited into the group shortly after his rescue from Ana Kravinoff due to his continuing hatred for Spider-Man. A warrant is later put on both him and Carlie. He is captured and taken to Ryker's Island. At Ryker's Island, many criminals attack him for his status as a policeman, but Spider-Man rescues him and breaks him out of jail. Vin apologizes to Carlie, and proceeds to arrest the Sergeant. His sister, Michelle Gonzales, who is an attorney, works out a plea deal for him, giving him six months in prison and a removal from the NYPD in exchange for the names of all the police involved.

Vin is later released and returns home turning a new leaf. However, at a going away party for Harry Osborn, Vin confronts Harry and reveals that he works for Norman Osborn and has a Green Goblin tattoo. He tells Harry that Norman is aware of the child's birth. Harry follows Vin and tasers and assaults him, saying he has no intention of letting Norman get close to his child.

Other versions

MC2
In the MC2 Universe, Vin appeared within the pages of Amazing Spider-Man Family #4. He is partner with Carlie at the time she gave Peter the inspiration to work with the police, which he currently does within the pages of Spider-Girl.

In other media

Television
 Vin Gonzales (along with his partner Alan O'Neal) make unnamed appearances in the series The Spectacular Spider-Man. In "Natural Selection", Vin aims and shoots his gun at the Lizard when its terrorizing the subway. In "Probable Cause", he and O'Neal have a ride-along with Mary Jane Watson and Mark Allan, with his partner joking about the students' attraction to each other.

See also
 Kraven's First Hunt

References

Spider-Man characters
Fictional New York City Police Department officers
Comics characters introduced in 2007
Characters created by Dan Slott